Sergei Aleksandrovich Osipov (born 10 July 1978) is a Russian former professional footballer.

Club career
He made his professional debut in the Russian Third League in 1996 for FC Zenit-d St. Petersburg.

Honours
1999: Russian Cup winner
2001: Russian Premier League bronze
2002: Russian Cup finalist
2003: Russian Premier League runner-up and Russian Premier League Cup winner
2006: Ukrainian Premier League bronze

European club competitions
 UEFA Intertoto Cup 2000 with FC Zenit St. Petersburg: 5 games.
 UEFA Cup 2002–03 with FC Zenit St. Petersburg: 3 games, 3 goals.
 UEFA Cup 2003–04 with FC Torpedo Moscow: 4 games, 1 goal.

References

1978 births
Footballers from Saint Petersburg
Living people
Russian footballers
Russia under-21 international footballers
Association football midfielders
Russian Premier League players
Ukrainian Premier League players
FC Zenit Saint Petersburg players
FC Torpedo Moscow players
FC Chornomorets Odesa players
Russian expatriate footballers
Expatriate footballers in Ukraine
Russian expatriate sportspeople in Ukraine
FC Zenit-2 Saint Petersburg players